Crossidius mojavensis is a species of beetle in the family Cerambycidae. It was described by Linsley in 1955.

References

Trachyderini
Beetles described in 1955